Everton Chimulirenji (56 years old) is a Malawian politician. He served as the Vice President of Malawi under president Peter Mutharika after they won the 2019 elections. Chimulirenji was not well known before becoming Mutharika’s running mate. Chimulirenji's tenure was short, having served May 2019 to February 2020, when his vice-presidency was voided and he was replaced by his predecessor after the 2019 general election results were nullified.

Previously he was elected to the Parliament of Malawi in 2009. Later he served as Deputy Minister of Defence and then as Minister of Civic Education, Culture and Community Development.

References

Living people
Vice-presidents of Malawi
Democratic Progressive Party (Malawi) politicians
Government ministers of Malawi
Year of birth missing (living people)